Washington is a town in Berkshire County, Massachusetts, United States. It is part of the Pittsfield, Massachusetts, Metropolitan Statistical Area. The population was 494 at the 2020 census.

History 

Washington was first settled in 1760 and was officially incorporated in 1777. The town was known by several different names, including Greenoch, Watsontown and Hartville, before being renamed in 1784 for George Washington. The town has always been rural, with few small industries, known more for being along the stage road to Pittsfield and along the rail line later.

Geography
Located in central Berkshire County along the Hampshire County line, the town, which is roughly shaped, is bordered by Pittsfield to the northwest, Dalton, Hinsdale and Peru to the north, Middlefield to the east, Becket to the southeast, Lee to the southwest, and Lenox to the west.

Washington lies within the Berkshire Hills, and its geography is dominated by October Mountain in the western part of town. The mountain, which is surrounded by the October Mountain State Forest, rises to its high plain above the banks of the Housatonic River, falling slowly eastward towards the valley where Depot Brook (which feeds into a branch of the Westfield River) and the east branch of the Housatonic rise. There are several small reservoirs and lakes throughout the town as well. Along the mountain, the Appalachian Trail crosses through town, and the town is home to the Bucksteep Manor Cross Country Ski Area.

Massachusetts Route 8 is the only state route through town, passing from Becket to Hinsdale. The nearest interstate highway, Interstate 90 (the Massachusetts Turnpike), is accessible in neighboring Lee. The town has a rail line, the CSX Berkshire Subdivision, operated by CSX and used by Amtrak. The summit of the Berkshires on the rail line is 0.1 mi north of Summit Hill Road bridge in Washington. The nearest regional airport is Pittsfield Municipal Airport, and the nearest scheduled commercial passenger flights are at Bradley International Airport in Connecticut.

Demographics

As of the census of 2000, there were 544 people, 203 households, and 163 families residing in the town.  The town ranks 28th out of 32 cities and towns in Berkshire County by population, and 340th out of 351 cities and towns in Massachusetts.  The population density was 14.4 people per square mile (5.6/km), ranking it second to last in the county and sixth to last in the state.  There were 236 housing units at an average density of 6.2 per square mile (2.4/km).  The racial makeup of the town was 99.45% White, 0.37% African American, and 0.18% from two or more races. Hispanic or Latino of any race were 0.74% of the population.

There were 203 households, out of which 36.5% had children under the age of 18 living with them, 67.0% were married couples living together, 8.4% had a female householder with no husband present, and 19.7% were non-families. 14.8% of all households were made up of individuals, and 6.4% had someone living alone who was 65 years of age or older.  The average household size was 2.68 and the average family size was 2.96.

In the town, the population was spread out, with 26.5% under the age of 18, 5.7% from 18 to 24, 25.2% from 25 to 44, 32.7% from 45 to 64, and 9.9% who were 65 years of age or older.  The median age was 41 years. For every 100 females, there were 106.1 males.  For every 100 females age 18 and over, there were 104.1 males.

The median income for a household in the town was $54,583, and the median income for a family was $55,357. Males had a median income of $40,417 versus $27,143 for females. The per capita income for the town was $23,610.  About 4.8% of families and 6.9% of the population were below the poverty line, including 12.5% of those under age 18 and 7.1% of those age 65 or over.

Government
Washington uses the open town meeting form of government, and is led by a board of selectmen. The town has its own police and public works department. Washington has no fire department or public library but relies on both Hinsdale and Becket having facilities. The nearest hospital, Berkshire Medical Center, is in Pittsfield.

On the state level, Washington is represented in the Massachusetts House of Representatives as part of the Second Berkshire district, represented by Paul Mark, which covers central Berkshire County, as well as portions of Hampshire and Franklin counties. In the Massachusetts Senate, the town is part of the Berkshire, Hampshire and Franklin district, represented by Ben Downing, which includes all of Berkshire County and western Hampshire and Franklin counties. The town is patrolled by the Fourth (Cheshire) Station of Barracks "B" of the Massachusetts State Police, and is the southernmost town in that station's patrol area.

On the national level, Washington is represented in the United States House of Representatives as part of Massachusetts's 1st congressional district, and is represented by Richard Neal of Springfield since 2012. Massachusetts is currently represented in the United States Senate by senior Senator Elizabeth Warren and junior Senator Ed Markey.

Education
Washington is one of the seven towns in the Central Berkshire Regional School District, the largest district (by land area) in the Commonwealth. Students in Washington attend the Beckett-Washington Elementary School in neighboring Becket for elementary school. All students in the district travel to Dalton to attend Nessacus Regional Middle School for sixth through eighth grades and Wahconah Regional High School for the high grades. There are no private schools in Washington, with the nearest being in the Pittsfield area.

The nearest community college is Berkshire Community College in Pittsfield.  The nearest state colleges are Massachusetts College of Liberal Arts in North Adams and Westfield State University in Westfield, and the nearest state university is the University of Massachusetts Amherst.

Notable people

 Arlo Guthrie, Folk singer

References

External links
Town of Washington official website

 
Towns in Berkshire County, Massachusetts
Towns in Massachusetts